The  Qualifications and Curriculum Development Agency (QCDA) was a charity, and an executive non-departmental public body (NDPB) of the Department for Education. In England and Northern Ireland, the QCDA maintained and developed the National Curriculum and associated assessments, tests and examinations, advising the minister formerly known as the Secretary of State for Education on these matters.

Regulatory functions regarding examination and assessment boards have been transferred to Ofqual, an independent regulator.

Education and qualifications in Scotland and Wales are the responsibility of the Scottish Government and Welsh Government and their agencies. In Scotland, for example, the Scottish Qualifications Authority is the responsible body.

In May 2010 the Secretary of State announced his intention to promote legislation that would transfer obligations of the QCDA to Ofqual. The newly formed Standards and Testing Agency took on the functions of the agency 3 October 2011. QCDA's Chief Executive Officer, Andrew Hall, is also a member of the Executive Board of the British examination board AQA.

Partners
QCDA worked closely with its main strategic partners, including the Department for Education, the Office for Standards in Education (Ofsted), employers' organisations, the Training and Development Agency for Schools (TDA), the Skills Funding Agency, the former General Teaching Council for England (GTCE) and the Sector Skills Councils (SSC).

QCDA also collaborated with the other public qualification agencies in the UK: the Scottish Qualifications Authority (SQA) and the Council for the Curriculum, Examinations and Assessment in Northern Ireland (CCEA).

QCDA had its headquarter in Coventry, United Kingdom.

History
The Qualifications and Curriculum Authority (QCA) was formed on 1 October 1997, through a merger of the National Council for Vocational Qualifications (NCVQ) for vocational qualifications and the School Curriculum and Assessment Authority (SCAA) for academic qualifications. The QCA had additional powers and duties granted to it by the Education Act 1997, which established the role of the QCA. Under Section 24 of this Act, QCA was granted the right to regulate all external qualifications in England.

In April 2004, the QCA also launched the National Assessment Agency to take over the delivery and administration of National Curriculum assessments. The National Assessment Agency was transformed into a subdivision and its functions subsumed within the management structure of the QCA.

Formation of Ofqual
On 26 September 2007,  DCSF announced that the regulatory functions of the QCA were to become statutorily independent with transferring QCA's obligations to Ofqual.

On 8 April 2008, Ofqual began work as the independent regulator of exams and tests in England, accountable to Parliament rather than to government ministers. The remaining work of the QCA was transferred to the Ofqual. The QCA was formally reintegrated into Ofqual when Ofqual gained statutory status.

References

External links
 BBC News - Gove's statement on abolition
 http://www.inca.org.uk Funded by QCDA, INCA is the International Review of Curriculum and Assessment Frameworks Internet Archive. It provides regularly updated descriptions of government policy on education in Australia, Canada, England, France, Germany, Hungary, Ireland, Italy, Japan, Korea, the Netherlands, New Zealand, Northern Ireland, Scotland, Singapore, Spain, Sweden, Switzerland, the USA and Wales, and makes particular reference to the curriculum, assessment and initial teacher training frameworks in place. A description for South Africa has recently (October 2009) been added.
The INCA website focuses on education provided in schools and to the 3-19 age range.

Video clips
 QCA YouTube channel

Education in England
Education in Northern Ireland
Educational qualifications in the United Kingdom
Defunct public bodies of the United Kingdom
Organizations established in 1997
Exempt charities
Department for Education
Charities based in the West Midlands (county)
1997 establishments in the United Kingdom
Organisations based in Coventry